The Magyar Kupa Final was the final match of the 2015–16 Magyar Kupa, played between Újpest and Ferencváros.

Route to the final

Match

References

External links
 Official site 

2016
Ferencvárosi TC matches
Újpest FC matches